Craig Martin (born July 15, 1957) is a former Canadian national soccer team player.

Born in Niagara Falls, Ontario, Martin made 6 'A' international appearances for Canada, 4 in 1983 and 2 more in 1984.  A defender, he was also a member of the team that competed at the 1984 Summer Olympics in Los Angeles, California.

Martin played collegiately for McMaster University.  He then played for the Canadian Professional Soccer League's  Hamilton Steelers.

In 1995, Martin was inducted into the Niagara Falls Sports Hall of Fame.

Martin was the coach of the United States Virgin Islands national soccer team.

References

External links

Niagara Falls Sports Wall of Fame

Stats

1957 births
Living people
Canada men's international soccer players
Canadian Professional Soccer League (original) players
Canadian soccer players
Association football defenders
Footballers at the 1984 Summer Olympics
Hamilton Steelers (1981–1992) players
McMaster University alumni
Olympic soccer players of Canada
Canadian soccer coaches
Expatriate soccer managers in the United States Virgin Islands
United States Virgin Islands national soccer team managers
Soccer people from Ontario
Sportspeople from Niagara Falls, Ontario
Kitchener Spirit players